St Thomas of Canterbury Church may refer to:

 Cathedral Church of St Thomas of Canterbury, Portsmouth, United Kingdom
 St Thomas of Canterbury Church, Canterbury, Kent, UK
 St Thomas of Canterbury Church, Chester, Cheshire, UK
 Church of St Thomas of Canterbury, Clapham, Bedfordshire, UK
 Church of St Thomas of Canterbury, Cothelstone, Somerset, UK
 St Thomas of Canterbury Church, Fulham, London, UK
 St Thomas of Canterbury Church, Woodford Green, London, UK
 Church of St Thomas of Canterbury, Kingswear, Devon, UK
 Church of St Thomas of Canterbury and the English Martyrs, Preston, Lancashire, UK
 Church of St Thomas of Canterbury and English Martyrs, St Leonards-on-Sea, East Sussex, UK
 Church of St Thomas of Canterbury, Woodbridge, Suffolk, UK

See also
 St Thomas of Canterbury Church of England Aided Junior School